James Wylie may refer to:
 Sir James Wylie, 1st Baronet (1768–1854), Scottish physician
 James Aitken Wylie (1808–1890), Scottish historian of religion and Presbyterian minister
 James Hamilton Wylie (1844–1914), British historian and author
 Jim Wylie (1887–1956), New Zealand rugby union player